Kenneth Alessio Bianchi (born May 22, 1951) is an American serial killer, kidnapper, and rapist. He is known for the Hillside Strangler murders committed with his cousin Angelo Buono Jr. in Los Angeles, California, as well as for murdering two more women in Washington by himself. Bianchi is currently serving a sentence of life imprisonment in Washington State Penitentiary for these crimes. Bianchi was also at one time a suspect in the Alphabet murders, three unsolved murders in his home city of Rochester, New York, from 1971 to 1973.

Early life 
Kenneth Bianchi was born on May 22, 1951, in Rochester, New York, to a 17-year-old alcoholic sex worker who gave him up for adoption two weeks after he was born. He was adopted in August 1951 by Nicholas Bianchi and his wife Frances Scioliono-Bianchi, and was their only child. Bianchi was deeply troubled from a young age, with his adoptive mother describing him as "a compulsive liar" from the time he could talk. He would often fall into inattentive, trance-like daydreams where his eyes would roll back into his head. From these symptoms, a physician diagnosed the 5-year-old Bianchi with petit mal seizures. He was also frequently given physical examinations by doctors because of an involuntary urination problem, causing him a great deal of humiliation. 

Bianchi had many behavioural problems and was prone to fits of anger as well as bouts of insomnia and habitually urinating in his own bed constantly when he was young. On January 2, 1957, Bianchi accidentally fell off of a jungle gym and landed on his face. His mother, in an attempt to change his ways, sent him to a private Catholic elementary school and also responded by taking him to a psychiatrist multiple times, with Bianchi being diagnosed with a passive-aggressive personality disorder at the age of ten. Bianchi's intelligence quotient was measured at 116 at the age of eleven, but, despite having above-average intelligence, he was an underachiever and was removed twice from schools because he failed to get along with teachers. Frances described him as "lazy" and his teachers claimed that he was working below his capacity.

He pulled down a 6-year-old girl's underwear sometime in July of 1963 after deciding that he liked doing it. After his adoptive father died suddenly from pneumonia in 1964, the teenaged Bianchi refused to cry or show any other signs of grief. After her husband's death, Frances had to work while her son attended a public high school and was known for keeping him home from school for long periods of time. Nonetheless, Bianchi dated frequently and even joined a motorcycle club. Shortly after he graduated from Gates-Chili High School in 1970, Bianchi married his high school sweetheart, Brenda Beck. The union ended after eight months. Supposedly, she left him without an explanation. 

As an adult, Bianchi decided that he wanted to become a police officer, and he enrolled at Monroe Community College to study police science and psychology but dropped out of college after just one semester and drifted through a series of menial jobs, finally ending up as a security guard at a jewellery store. This gave him the opportunity to steal valuables, which he often gave to girlfriends or prostitutes to buy their loyalty. He applied for a position at the sheriff's department but was rejected. Because of his many petty thefts, Bianchi was constantly on the move. Bianchi moved to Los Angeles, California, in 1976 and started spending time with his older cousin (and Frances's nephew), Angelo Buono, who impressed Bianchi with his fancy clothes, jewellery, and talent for getting any woman he wanted and "putting them in their place." Before long, they worked together as pimps and, by late 1977, had escalated to what would become known as the "Hillside Strangler" murders. Bianchi and Buono had raped and murdered ten young women and girls by the time they were arrested in early 1979.

Murders
Bianchi and Buono would usually cruise around Los Angeles in Buono's car and use fake badges to persuade women that they were police officers. Their victims were women and girls aged 12 to 28 from various walks of life. They would order the victims into Buono's car, one of several retired squad cars they were able to purchase at auction and outfit with flashing roof lights to simulate authentic police vehicles. They would then drive them to Buono's home to torture and murder them.

Both men would sexually abuse their victims before strangling them. They experimented with other methods of killing, such as lethal injection, electric shock, and carbon monoxide poisoning. Even while committing the murders, Bianchi applied for a job with the Los Angeles Police Department (LAPD) and had even been taken for several rides with police officers while they were searching for the Hillside Strangler. Shortly after Bianchi committed the eleventh and twelfth murders, he revealed to Buono that he had gone on LAPD police ride-alongs and that he was currently being questioned about the Strangler case. Buono flew into a rage and threatened to kill Bianchi if he did not move to Bellingham, Washington, which he did in May 1978, thereby ending their criminal partnership. The total number of crimes and murders that the duo committed together are as follows:
October 17, 1977, Cathedral City, California: The body of a naked woman was found on a hillside near the Ventura highway at 6510 Forest Lawn Drive in Los Angeles, positioned in a lewd manner. She was identified as 19-year-old Yolanda Washington. Her body had been cleaned before being dumped and faint rope marks were visible around her neck, wrists, and ankles. She had been beaten, raped and strangled to death and was the first confirmed mutual victim of Bianchi and Buono. The two men picked her up and killed her in their vehicle as they pretended to be police officers in civilian attire.
 October 31, 1977, La Crescenta-Montrose, California: Judith Lynn “Judy” Miller, 15, was a student at Hollywood High School who also worked as a prostitute. In the 8300 Block of Sunset Boulevard, West Hollywood, she was looking for clients when Bianchi and Buono approached her. She was murdered in Angelo's upholstery shop at 703 West Colorado Boulevard in Glendale, and her body was dumped next to 2844 Alta Terrace in La Crescenta, a flood control channel. Her naked body was discovered on Halloween, 1977, face up in a parkway in the hills above Glendale. Her legs were posed in the shape of a diamond, and she had been raped, sodomised, and strangled. Her neck, wrists, and ankles all displayed evidence of ligature marks.
 November 6, 1977, Glendale, California: Elissa Teresa Kastin, 21, was a dancer and waitress working in North Hollywood. Her body was found on November 6 next to a country club in the Chevy Chase Canyon neighbourhood. She had been beaten, raped but not sodomised, and strangled when she was discovered naked with rope marks on her wrists and ankles. Her co-workers had noticed that she had been conversing with two clients who were acting strangely the evening before she had vanished.
November 13, 1977, Highland Park, California: Sonja Johnson, 14, and Dolores Ann “Dolly” Cepeda, 12, were the Hillside Stranglers’ youngest victims and were both two close friends who were abducted after getting off a bus at Eagle Rock Plaza. Presenting fake police identification, Buono and Bianchi kidnapped the two. In Glendale, California, at Buono's upholstery shop, Cepeda and Sonja were killed. On November 20, their bodies were discovered in a garbage pile. Although their bodies were already starting to decompose, it was determined that both had been raped and killed by being strangled.
November 20, 1977, Highland Park, California: Kristina Weckler, 20, was found by hikers partially under a bush on a hillside in a residential area of Los Angeles. She had neck, wrist, and ankle ligature marks but no self-defense wounds. Her breasts were bruised, she had two puncture scars on her arm, and her rectum was gushing blood. Later, it was determined that Windex cleaning fluid had been injected into her to torture her. She was also fatally asphyxiated with gas from an oven. Weckler's naked body was discovered not far from her Glendale residence.
November 23, 1977, Los Angeles, California: Evelyn Jane King, 28, an aspiring actress and Scientologist, was found dead in some bushes near the Los Feliz Exit on the Golden State freeway. On November 9 while awaiting a bus, she vanished. It was impossible to tell if she had been raped or tortured due to the severity of the decomposition, but it was strongly suspected that she had been sodomised in addition to being strangled to death.
November 29, 1977, Glassell Park, California: Lauren Rae Wagner, 18, was a business school student found dead on the west side of Mount Washington at 1217 Cliff Drive in Glassell Park. She appeared to have been burned by an electrical cord while being tortured based on the burn marks on the inside of her hands. Additionally, there was evidence that suggested Wagner was handcuffed before being strangled to death. At this time, investigators came to the conclusion that the perpetrator might have been a police officer or a person pretending to be one. They consequently issued a caution to female drivers who were stopped by policemen to double-check that they were in fact law enforcement.
 December 9, 1977, Echo Park, California: Kimberly “Kim” Diane Martin, 17, a sex worker and model, was found naked on a deserted lot near Los Angeles City Hall. In the Silver Lake neighbourhood, Kimberly's body had been dumped over the side of a hill, where it could be seen from police headquarters. She was working for an outcall escort service when she was called to 1950 Tamarind, Hollywood on the night of her murder. She was slain in an empty apartment, and her body was thrown in Echo Park near 2006 N. Alvarado. Before being cruelly strangled, Martin was raped and tortured.
February 16, 1978, La Cañada Flintridge, California: Cindy Lee Hudspeth, 20, was a waitress who was sexually assaulted, strangled to death, and then had her body placed in the trunk of her Datsun before being pushed off a cliff on Angeles Crest Highway on Thursday, February 16. The following day, she was discovered. She had been tortured; ligature marks were apparent on her neck, ankles, and wrists.
January 11, 1979, Bellingham, Washington: On January 11, working as a security guard, Bianchi lured two female students into a house he was guarding. The women were 22-year-old Karen Lauretta Mandic and 27-year-old Diane Amy Clark Wilder, both students at Western Washington University. Bianchi forced Mandic down the stairs in front of him and then strangled her. He murdered Wilder in a similar fashion. Without help from his partner, Bianchi left many clues and police apprehended him the next day. A California driver's license and a routine background check linked him to the addresses of two Strangler victims. These last two murders were committed by Bianchi alone, without help from Buono.

Footnotes
The Alphabet murders occurred in and around Rochester from 1971 to 1973. Three young girls were kidnapped, sexually assaulted and murdered. Bianchi was never formally charged in these crimes, but he was a suspect because he worked as an ice cream vendor near two of the murder scenes and drove a car similar to a suspicious vehicle spotted near one of the abduction sites. Bianchi has denied any responsibility for these murders.
On September 4, 1977, the body of Laura Collins, age 26, was discovered in Griffith Park strangled to death. Collins was initially included by the Los Angeles media as a potential victim of the Hillside Strangler, but a 1979 complaint against Buono and Bianchi did not ultimately list Collins as one of their victims. Buono and Bianchi were never found guilty of her murder or confessed to it. Collins' death is still unsolved.
 Jill Terry Barcomb, 18, was a woman from Oneida, New York, who was killed in Southern California on November 10, 1977. She was molested, beaten, and strangled and was found rolled up like a ball in a ravine off Mulholland Highway and originally was thought to have been a victim of the Hillside Strangler. However, her case was ultimately decided by authorities to have been unrelated after the arrests of Bianchi and Buono. Neither men confessed or were ever convicted of the murder. In March 2010, serial killer Rodney Alcala was convicted of her murder as well as with four others.
On November 16, 1977, Kathleen Kimberly Robinson, a 17-year-old high school student and a frequent hitchhiker living in Hollywood was last seen alive near the beach in Santa Monica. The next day, she was discovered dead in a parkway in the Wilshire district of Los Angeles. She was initially believed to be a victim of the Hillside Strangler, but as soon as it was discovered that the circumstances of her case was different from the others, a connection was quickly ruled out. Kathleen's murder is still listed as "unsolved" by the LAPD.
Following his arrest, Bianchi admitted that in 1977 he and Buono, while posing as police officers, stopped a young woman called Catharine Lorre with the intention of abducting and killing her, but released her after learning she was the daughter of actor Peter Lorre. Only after the men were arrested did Catharine learn of their identities.

Trial 
At his trial, Bianchi pleaded not guilty by reason of insanity, claiming that another personality, one "Steve Walker", had committed the crimes. It was believed he had recently seen the film Sybil, about a woman suffering from multiple personalities triggered by childhood abuse. He convinced a few expert psychiatrists that he indeed suffered from multiple personality disorder, but investigators brought in their own psychiatrists, mainly Martin Orne. When Orne mentioned to Bianchi that in genuine cases of the disorder, there tend to be three or more personalities, Bianchi promptly created another alias, "Billy". 

To prove that Bianchi had lied about having multiple personalities to avoid being prosecuted, Orne tested him by introducing him to his lawyer, who was not present. Bianchi interacted with the imaginary lawyer. Orne then brought in his real lawyer, flustering Bianchi, who claimed that the imaginary lawyer had vanished. Prior to his actual lawyer's appearance, Bianchi even leaned over to shake the hand of the imaginary one; an action which is referred to as "tactile hallucinations" that experts explained is an event that rarely, if ever, happens during hypnosis nor other types of neurological-event triggered hallucination. Orne had never once seen a true "tactile hallucination" in his career, suggesting that this was a complete fabrication. Bianchi eventually pleaded guilty in order to avoid the death penalty in Washington State.

Eventually, investigators discovered that the name "Steven Walker" came from a student whose identity Bianchi had previously attempted to steal for the purpose of fraudulently practicing psychology. Police also found a small library of books in Bianchi's home on topics of modern psychology, further indicating his ability to fake the disorder. Once his claims were subjected to scrutiny, Bianchi eventually admitted that he had been faking the disorder. He was eventually diagnosed with antisocial personality disorder with sexual sadism.

In an attempt to obtain a reduced sentence, Bianchi agreed to testify against Buono. However, in giving his testimony, he made every effort to be as uncooperative and self-contradictory as possible, apparently hoping to avert Buono's conviction. In the end, Bianchi's efforts were unsuccessful, as Buono was convicted and sentenced to life imprisonment. Bianchi himself was also ultimately sentenced to life imprisonment with the possibility of parole.

In 1980, Bianchi began a relationship with Veronica Compton, a woman he had met while in prison. During his trial, she testified for the defense, telling the jury a false, vague tale about the crimes in an attempt to exculpate Bianchi. She also admitted to wanting to buy a mortuary with another convicted murderer for the purpose of necrophilia. She was later convicted and imprisoned for attempting to strangle a woman she had lured to a motel in an attempt to convince authorities that the Hillside Strangler was still on the loose. Bianchi allegedly had given her some semen during a prison visit to plant on the planned victim to make it look like a rape/murder committed by the Strangler.

In 1992, Bianchi sued Catherine Yronwode for $8.5 million for having an image of his face depicted on a trading card; he claimed his face was trademarked. The judge dismissed the case after ruling that, if Bianchi had been using his face as a trademark when he was killing women, he would not have tried to hide it from the police.

Detention 
Bianchi is serving his sentence at Washington State Penitentiary in Walla Walla, Washington. He was denied parole on August 18, 2010, by a state board in Sacramento. He will be eligible to apply for parole again in 2025.

See also
 List of serial killers in the United States
 List of serial killers by number of victims

References

Further reading
 
The Mind of a Murderer, Parts 1 and 2 (1985), PBS documentary

1951 births
1977 murders in the United States
20th-century American criminals
American adoptees
American male criminals
American murderers of children
American people convicted of murder
American pimps
American prisoners sentenced to life imprisonment
American rapists
American serial killers
Criminals from Los Angeles
Criminals from New York (state)
Living people
Male serial killers
People convicted of murder by Washington (state)
People from Rochester, New York
People with antisocial personality disorder
People with passive-aggressive personality disorder
People with sexual sadism disorder
Prisoners sentenced to life imprisonment by Washington (state)
Violence against women in the United States